

Chess Olympiads

South Africa first participated in the 1958 Olympiad in Munich. The team stopped participating in international chess in 1974 due to the sports boycott as a result of the country's apartheid policies, returning to play at the 1992 Olympiad after the end of apartheid.

Open

 - In 1974, FIDE expelled the team with three rounds to go due to the country's apartheid policies.

Women

Major tournaments

Major tournaments hosted in South Africa include the South African Chess Championship and the South African Open.

References